Pechatniki is a station on the Bolshaya Koltsevaya line of the Moscow Metro, in the Pechatniki District, between the planned stations Tekstilshchiki and Nagatinsky Zaton. There is a transfer to the Lyublinsko–Dmitrovskaya line, via its Pechatniki station.  The nearby Pechatniki railway station opened in 2022 to allow for transfers to Line D2 of the Moscow Central Diameters, as part of a new transport interchange hub estimated to serve around 70,000 people daily.

The station is one of 14 Moscow Metro stations that were opened on 1 March 2023.

Gallery

Notes

References 

Bolshaya Koltsevaya line
Moscow Metro stations

ru:Печатники (станция метро, Большая кольцевая линия)